Them: A Novel is a 2007 debut fictional novel by Nathan McCall.

Overview
Barlowe Reed, an African American in his forties, buys a home in Atlanta's Old Fourth Ward, and must come to grips with new white neighbors and rampant gentrification.

References

External links
Them: A Novel at Simon & Schuster

2007 American novels
2007 debut novels
African-American history in Atlanta
African-American novels
Books about race and ethnicity
Gentrification in the United States
Housing in Georgia (U.S. state)
Novels set in Atlanta
Works about gentrification
Atria Publishing Group books